Ponta Baleia (Portuguese for "whale point") is a headland and a settlement in the south of Caué District on São Tomé Island in São Tomé and Príncipe. Its population is 43 (2012 census). The locality lies 1.5 km east of Porto Alegre and 2 km southeast of Vila Malanza. A ferry goes from Ponta Baleia to Ilhéu das Rolas.

Population history

References

Populated places in Caué District
Populated coastal places in São Tomé and Príncipe
Landforms of São Tomé and Príncipe